was an  that served as an armed merchant cruiser in the Second World War. She was launched in 1939 and completed in 1940 for Osaka Shosen Lines.

In 1941 she was commissioned into the Imperial Japanese Navy. She served as a commerce raider and submarine tender. Two Allied naval ships sank her in a naval engangement in 1942.

Building
Hōkoku Maru was designed as a cargo liner for Shosen Line's scheduled services to South America. She was laid down at the Tama shipyard in Okayama Prefecture on 18 August 1938. She was launched on 5 July 1939 and completed on 22 June 1940.

Designed as a luxury ocean liner, she had a luxury suite of rooms called the Nara Suite after the city of that name. However, the Japanese admiralty influenced the design of the Hōkoku Maru-class, to make them suitable for use as troop ships. The Japanese government provided large subsidies for such dual-purpose designs from 1936 onwards.

She had two screws, each powered by a 12-cylinder, single-acting, two-stroke diesel engine.

Civilian career
Hōkoku Maru was registered in Osaka. Her call sign was JCSN.

Instead of running between Japan and South America, Hōkoku Maru mostly operated between Kobe in Japan and Dairen in the Japanese puppet state of Manchukuo, with some calls at Moji, Yokohama and Nagoya. Her only recorded voyage to South America started from Moji on 27 July 1940. She then resumed her route between Dairen and Kobe.

Conversion
On 29 August 1941 the Japanese Navy requisitioned Hōkoku Maru. The Mitsubishi Heavy Industries shipyard at Kobe armed her with four 15 cm/50 41st Year Type guns, two QF 12 pounder 12 cwt naval guns, two Type 93 13.2-mm machine guns and two twin-mount  torpedo tubes. In October 1941 she was fitted with 900mm and 1,100mm searchlights and a boom for handling a Kawanishi E7K floatplane, with a second aircraft as a spare.

Despite her intended role as a commerce raider, little attempt was made to disguise Hōkoku Maru as a merchant ship. Her guns were fitted with gun-shields and were left in open sight, and she was painted in two-tone naval camouflage.

Naval career
Hōkoku Maru was commissioned into the Japanese Navy on 20 September 1941 under the command of Captain Aihara Aritaka.

On 15 November 1941 Hōkoku Maru and her sister ship , sailed for Jaluit in preparation for the opening of hostilities against the United States. On 7 December 1941 the two ships were in the Tuamotu Archipelago at the start of a two-month raiding voyage that sank two Allied merchant ships: St Vincent off Pitcairn Island and  near the Cook Islands, before returning to Japan in February 1942.

In Japan, Hōkoku Maru was refitted, and was re-armed with 8 x 140mm (5.5 inch) guns. She was also outfitted as a submarine tender to support operations by the IJN's 8th Submarine Squadron off East Africa.

In May 1942, Hōkoku Maru, again with Aikoku Maru, sailed for Singapore, thence to the Indian Ocean. There they captured the Dutch tanker Genota south of Diego-Suarez, Madagascar, and sank the British cargo ship Elysia south of the Mozambique Channel, before re-arming the submarines of the 8th Submarine Squadron off the east coast of Africa.

In July 1942 the two raiders captured the New Zealand cargo ship Hauraki, which they sent to Singapore under a prize crew. Returning to Singapore, Hōkoku Maru was re-equipped with two Aichi E13A (Allied reporting name "Jake") floatplanes, and an experimental two-tone dazzle camouflage scheme.

In November 1942 Hōkoku Maru, again in company with Aikoku Maru, left Singapore for the Indian Ocean, on what would be her last raiding voyage.

Loss
On 7 November 1942, Hōkoku Maru and Aikoku Maru passed through the Sunda Strait into the Indian Ocean. As Hōkoku Maru engaged, Bengal and Ondina returned fire, and a shell, probably from Ondina's single  gun, hit Hōkoku Maru's starboard torpedo mount, causing an explosion and uncontrollable fire which spread to the aft magazine. After a series of explosions, Hōkoku Maru sank just two hours after the action commenced. Aikoku Maru rescued 278 of her crew. Both Ondina and Bengal escaped.

References

Bibliography
Gardiner R, Chesnau R (1980) Conway's All the World's Fighting Ships 1922–1946 London, Conway Maritime Press 
Lloyd's Register of Shipping (1941) Volume II: Steamers and Motorships of 300 Tons Gross and Over. London, Lloyd's Register of Shipping, via Southampton City Council

External links
Hackett R, Kingsepp S, IJN Hokoku Maru: Tabular Record of Movement. combinedfleet.com; retrieved 13 December 2018
Kindell Don, 11th – Action of the "Bengal" and "Ondina" Campaign Summaries of World War 2: Indian Ocean & South East Asia, including Burma. Part 1 of 2 – 1939–1942. navalhistory.net; retrieved 13 December 2018

Ships built by Mitsui Engineering and Shipbuilding
1940 ships
Maritime incidents in November 1942
Auxiliary cruisers of the Imperial Japanese Navy
Submarine tenders of the Imperial Japanese Navy
Auxiliary ships of the Imperial Japanese Navy
World War II shipwrecks in the Indian Ocean